Nitratireductor aquimarinus is a Gram-negative, aerobic bacteria from the genus of Nitratireductor which was isolated from Skeletonema costatum from the Sea of Japan.

References

Phyllobacteriaceae
Bacteria described in 2011